USS LST-843 was an  built for the United States Navy during World War II.
 
LST-843 was laid down on 13 October 1944 at Ambridge, Pennsylvania, by the American Bridge Company; launched on 29 November 1944; sponsored by R. S. Dyson; and commissioned on 23 December 1944.

Service history
During World War II, LST-843 was assigned to the Asiatic-Pacific theater and participated in the assault and occupation of Okinawa Gunto from April through June 1945. Following the War, the ship performed occupation duty in the Far East and saw service in China until early December 1947. She was decommissioned on 18 December 1947, transferred to the Philippines and renamed BPR Bulacan. On 22 January 1948 the tank landing ship was struck from the Naval Vessel Register.

LST-843 earned one battle star for World War II service.

References

 

1944 ships
LST-542-class tank landing ships
Ships built in Ambridge, Pennsylvania
Ships transferred from the United States Navy to the Philippine Navy
World War II amphibious warfare vessels of the United States
Korean War amphibious warfare vessels of the Philippines